Nadir Minotti (born 16 May 1992) is an Italian football midfielder. He currently plays for Calcio Valcalepio.

Career
Born in Bergamo, Minotti began his career in local side Atalanta's youth categories,  After spending two full seasons with Primavera team, Minotti was promoted to main squad, and receiving the #88 jersey.

On 20 November 2011, Minotti made his debut for La Dea, in a 2–2 away draw against Siena, after came off the bench to replace Giacomo Bonaventura in 66th minute. Minotti also played 9 games for Primavera team in 2011–12 season.

In July 2012, Minotti was loaned to newly promoted S.S. Virtus Lanciano 1924, alongside Alberto Almici. In 2013 the loan was renewed.

On 11 July 2014 he was signed by another Serie B club F.C. Crotone.

On 15 July 2016 he was signed by Sambenedettese. On 31 August he was signed by Pistoiese.

References

External links
 
 
 Nadir Minotti National Team Stats at FIGC.it 
 AIC profile 

1992 births
Living people
Italian footballers
Atalanta B.C. players
S.S. Virtus Lanciano 1924 players
F.C. Crotone players
Calcio Foggia 1920 players
Como 1907 players
Serie A players
Serie B players
Association football midfielders
Footballers from Bergamo